Paul di Resta (born 16 April 1986) is a British racing driver from Scotland, competing in the FIA World Endurance Championship for Peugeot Sport in their LMH entry. A former Deutsche Tourenwagen Masters (DTM) and Formula 3 Euro Series champion, di Resta did not secure a Formula One seat for 2014, instead rejoining Mercedes to race again in DTM. He is currently a reserve F1 driver for McLaren for the 2022 season, and a former commentator for Sky Sports' coverage of F1.

Personal life
Di Resta is of Italian descent and was born in Uphall, Scotland, and grew up in Bathgate, West Lothian. He is a former pupil of Bathgate Academy and supports Celtic Football Club. He now lives in Monaco, and is a cousin of racing drivers Dario and Marino Franchitti. His step-father was Scottish footballer Dougie McCracken. His younger brother, Stefan, has raced at an amateur level and his half-brother, Jon, is a goalkeeper for the Norwich City u23's.

Di Resta and Laura Jordan became engaged in December 2013 and married on 28 August 2014.

Career

Karting
He started his career in karting, racing in various competitive series of karts from 1994 until 2002. In 2001 he won the British JICA Championship.

Formula Renault
He stepped up to single-seaters at the end of 2002, when he competed in the British Formula Renault Winter Series. He raced in British Formula Renault full-time in 2003 with the Eurotek Motorsport team, finishing seventh in the standings with one race win. He switched to Manor Motorsport for 2004, finishing third in the championship standings with four wins. He also entered some races of Eurocup Formula Renault 2.0 with the Manor team. He also won the McLaren Autosport BRDC Young Driver of The Year Award in 2004. The award had been won by his cousin Dario Franchitti in 1992.

Formula Three
Di Resta switched to the Formula Three Euroseries with Manor Motorsport in 2005, finishing tenth in the standings. For 2006 he moved to the ASM Formule 3 team, winning the championship with five wins, beating teammate and future Formula One World Drivers' Champion, Sebastian Vettel. Di Resta also won the 2006 BP Ultimate Masters at Circuit Park Zandvoort.

DTM

In 2007, di Resta switched from single-seaters to race in the Deutsche Tourenwagen Masters (DTM) touring car racing series, for Mercedes. In the championship, he finished 5th overall behind drivers Mattias Ekström (who won his second DTM title), Bruno Spengler, Martin Tomczyk and Jamie Green. Di Resta was the highest driver in the standings to drive a non-2007 car. His performances earned him a 2008 Mercedes C Klasse for the 2008 season, in which he won two races and finished second in the points, four points behind eventual champion Timo Scheider of Audi. In 2009, he finished third overall behind Scheider and compatriot Gary Paffett. In 2010, he won three races in a row on the way to winning the championship.

Formula One

Di Resta tested for the McLaren Formula One team, and was in the frame for a drive with the Force India team for the 2009 season due to the teams' shared engine supplier, Mercedes-Benz. However, Force India chose to retain Giancarlo Fisichella and Adrian Sutil, with Vitantonio Liuzzi as reserve driver.

Force India (2010–2013)

2010
In December 2009, with Fisichella having moved to Ferrari and Liuzzi being promoted to the race team, di Resta took part in a test with the team at the Jerez circuit alongside J. R. Hildebrand. At the Autosport International show in January 2010, he was said to be close to a deal as the team's test and reserve driver for the 2010 season. The deal was announced on 2 February. Di Resta made his Formula One race meeting début at the 2010 Australian Grand Prix, where he took part in the first free practice session in place of Sutil and finished 11th. He drove in the first practice session of all the following races until the Monaco Grand Prix where he did not take part. He resumed driving for the team at the European Grand Prix and the following British Grand Prix. After sitting out the German Grand Prix he returned for the Hungarian Grand Prix. Di Resta subsequently sat out the Belgian Grand Prix as Tonio Liuzzi and Adrian Sutil needed as much track-time as possible to get the feeling of the new parts. He participated in practice for the Italian Grand Prix, but did not participate in the Singapore or Japanese Grands Prix. The team elected that di Resta should miss the Korean Grand Prix to allow Liuzzi and Sutil to get used to the new track for the race.

2011

Di Resta joined Adrian Sutil in the Force India Formula One racing team for the  season, replacing Vitantonio Liuzzi. This was followed by another 10th place in Malaysia, 11th in China, and a retirement in Turkey, where he left the pits with a loose wheel. He was running fifth in Canada until a collision with Nick Heidfeld left him with a damaged car and a drive-through penalty, and later crashed out of the race on lap 67. He qualified sixth at Silverstone but finished 15th after a long pitstop due to a tyre mix-up.

His third points-scoring finish of the season came in Hungary, where he finished seventh in changeable conditions. In the  he finished 8th.  This was followed by a career-best sixth-place finish in Singapore, ahead of teammate Sutil, who finished eighth. He finished tenth in Korea, ninth in Abu Dhabi and eighth in Brazil.

2012

On 16 December 2011, it was announced that he was to be retained by Force India for the 2012 season, with Nico Hülkenberg taking the place of Sutil as his teammate. He qualified 15th for the season opener in Australia and finished 10th in the race, passing Jean-Éric Vergne and Nico Rosberg on the final lap. He was 12th in China. In Bahrain he qualified inside the top ten, having missed the second free practice session after several members of the team were caught up in a petrol bomb incident. Using a two-stop strategy he took sixth place in the race, which equalled his previous career-best result. He was 14th in Spain, a lap behind winner Pastor Maldonado; seventh in Monaco having started 15th on the grid; and 11th in Montreal. At the European Grand Prix he was the only driver on the grid who performed a one-stop strategy and came 7th whilst his teammate, Nico Hülkenberg, finished in 5th position.

After failing to score a point in the next three races, di Resta finished tenth in Belgium. The following weekend, at the Italian Grand Prix, di Resta showed strong pace in qualifying, setting the fourth fastest time in Q3, but took a five place grid penalty for a gearbox change to start the Grand Prix in ninth. He finished the race in eighth. At the Singapore Grand Prix, he qualified sixth and finished a career-best fourth, after the retirements of Maldonado and Hamilton. The final five races of the season resulted in only one further points-scoring finish – 9th place in Abu Dhabi.

2013

After qualifying outside the top ten in Australia, di Resta managed to battle through into the points, finishing just behind his teammate, Adrian Sutil in eighth place. In Malaysia, however di Resta retired after his car's wheel nuts kept jamming, and the team was ultimately forced to retire both cars.

Qualifying in 11th place for the Chinese Grand Prix, the race saw him finish in eighth place and he obtained four points.

Di Resta matched his career best result in Bahrain with a fourth place, being overtaken close to the end by Lotus's Romain Grosjean, depriving the Scot of a maiden podium. He followed that up with a seventh in Spain.

A disappointing qualifying session in the wet meant di Resta started from 17th in Monaco, however initially going for an aggressive two stop strategy; luck played its part and due to a red flag he was able to use a new set of tyres, and made ground to ninth-place finish with some good overtakes.

Another disappointing qualifying session at the next race in Canada saw di Resta starting in 17th position yet again. Starting on the harder medium compound tyre, di Resta was able to run the longest of all drivers on his first stint, going 56 laps before finally making his only pit stop. The strategy worked as di Resta finished the race in 7th.

After six consecutive point finishes, di Resta struggled in the later part of the season as his team Force India struggled to cope with new Pirelli tyres and he recorded five consecutive retirements.

On 12 December, it was announced that he would not be retained as a driver with Force India for the  season.

Williams (2016–2017)

2016
After a two-year absence from the sport, di Resta returned to Formula One as reserve driver for Williams.

2017
Williams retained di Resta as their reserve driver for 2017 whilst he competed for Mercedes in DTM.

His qualifying results were described as an "unbelievable job" by Mercedes F1 Director Toto Wolff, having competed without having driven the FW40 prior to the session. He ended the day in 19th place ahead of Marcus Ericsson and was 0.766s off his teammate Lance Stroll. He retired in the race after 60 laps.

McLaren (2020–22)

After another absence from Formula One, di Resta returned to the sport as a reserve driver after McLaren put him on standby for the 70th Anniversary Grand Prix at the Silverstone Circuit in Silverstone, United Kingdom.

DTM return (2014–2019)

In May 2014, di Resta returned to the Deutsche Tourenwagen Masters series driving for HWA Team, who manage the AMG Mercedes team in DTM. Di Resta finished the 2014 season in 15th place having scored points only three times, all three being 4th-place finishes.

Di Resta finished the 2018 season in 3rd place in the driver's championship, after winning three races at Hungaroring, Brands Hatch, and Misano.

In 2019, after five seasons driving for Mercedes, di Resta joined the Swiss motor racing team R-Motorsport, driving the Aston Martin Vantage DTM. Di Resta finished in 16th place having scored points only four times.

Endurance Racing (2019-present)
In 2018, Paul di Resta raced in the Asian Le Mans Series for United Autosports, scoring one win and 4 podiums alongside Philip Hanson and eventually winning the 2018-19 Asian Le Mans Series championship.  

Following their Asian Le Mans Series win, Di Resta and United Autosport competed in the 2019-20 FIA World Endurance Championship going onto to win the 2020 24 Hours of Le Mans alongside Hanson and Filipe Albuquerque in the LMP2 Class and finishing 5th overall.

On February 8, 2021, Peugeot Sport revealed di Resta will drive their LMH Hypercar entry in the 2022 FIA World Endurance Championship alongside  Mikkel Jensen and Jean-Éric Vergne. He, and the Peugeot team, competed in the last three races of the season with a P4 finish in the  6 Hours of Fuji and two retirements in the  6 Hours of Monza and the  8 Hours of Bahrain. In the end, Di Resta finished in P10 in the Driver's championship.

Broadcasting career (2016–2023)

Sky Sports F1 (2016–2023)
Since 2016, Di Resta has been a regular contributor to the Sky Sports F1 channel. He was a common presence as a co-commentator, analyst and one of the insiders in "Sky Race Control" during practices, qualifying sessions and races, alongside Jenson Button, Karun Chandhok, Anthony Davidson, Damon Hill, Nico Rosberg, and Johnny Herbert until being recently axed by Sky Sports in Jan 2023 along with Johnny Herbert.

Karting record

Karting career summary

Racing record

Racing career summary

– As di Resta was a guest driver, he was ineligible to score points.
* Season still in progress.

Complete Formula 3 Euro Series record
(key)

Complete Deutsche Tourenwagen Masters results
(key) (Races in bold indicate pole position) (Races in italics indicate fastest lap)

† Driver did not finish, but was classified as he completed 90% of the race distance.

Complete Formula One results
(key) (Races in bold indicate pole position; races in italics indicate fastest lap)

 Driver failed to finish the race, but was classified as he had completed more than 90% of the race distance.

Complete IMSA SportsCar Championship results

Complete 24 Hours of Le Mans results

Complete European Le Mans Series results
(key) (Races in bold indicate pole position; results in italics indicate fastest lap)

Complete FIA World Endurance Championship results

* Season still in progress.

References

External links

 Paul di Resta career statistics at Driver Database
 Official website
 

1986 births
Living people
People from Uphall
Sportspeople from West Lothian
People educated at Bathgate Academy
Scottish expatriates in Monaco
British expatriates in Monaco
Scottish racing drivers
Scottish people of Italian descent
British Formula Renault 2.0 drivers
Formula Renault Eurocup drivers
Formula 3 Euro Series drivers
Formula 3 Euro Series champions
Deutsche Tourenwagen Masters drivers
Deutsche Tourenwagen Masters champions
Italian Scottish racing drivers
Scottish Formula One drivers
Force India Formula One drivers
Williams Formula One drivers
24 Hours of Daytona drivers
24 Hours of Le Mans drivers
WeatherTech SportsCar Championship drivers
FIA World Endurance Championship drivers
Manor Motorsport drivers
ART Grand Prix drivers
Asian Le Mans Series drivers
United Autosports drivers
Peugeot Sport drivers
Mercedes-AMG Motorsport drivers
HWA Team drivers
R-Motorsport drivers
Eurotek Motorsport drivers
Aston Martin Racing drivers